Saltimbanco was a touring show by Cirque du Soleil. Saltimbanco ran from 1992 to 2006 in its original form, performed under a large circus tent called the Grand Chapiteau; its last performance in that form was in Rio de Janeiro, Brazil, on December 10, 2006. A new adaptation of the show started touring North America on July 31, 2007, with its first stop in London, Ontario, Canada. The new version was staged in arenas with fewer performances in each city it visited. The new version closed at the end of 2012.

The show was described by Cirque du Soleil as a celebration of life. Its creators say they developed it as an antidote to the violence and despair prevalent in the 20th century.

Etymology
English has lost the word saltimbank from current usage; but it is still familiar in Spanish, Portuguese and Italian as saltimbanco, and in French as saltimbanque, meaning street acrobat or entertainer. According to the company's site, the word "saltimbanco" comes from the Italian "saltare in banco", which means "to jump on a bench." The etymology of the word reflects its acrobatic associations. A salto means a jump in Italian; banco in this connection is a trestle holding a board, set up as a temporary stage for open-air performers. 'Saltimbanchi' were thus those who performed somersaults on a temporary platform—wandering acrobats, performing as buskers in the open air, the platform giving their audience a better view.

History
Saltimbanco was Cirque du Soleil's longest running production when it closed at the end of 2012. In 2011 it was the first show by Cirque du Soleil to be presented in Turkey, and Ukraine, in 2012 the first show in Slovakia and in Amman, Jordan. 
Saltimbancos last performance took place in Montreal on December 30, 2012 after 6,000 big top and arena appearances before 14 million spectators in 200 cities worldwide.

Set and technical information
Saltimbancos set played on opposites and contradictions located within a cityscape.  A rosace made of metal rings suspended over the stage allowed light to filter through like leaves on a tree.  The lighting was cinematic in effect due to the usage of different colored gels.  The facts listed below applied to the arena format of Saltimbanco, although some of these were also applicable to the grand chapiteau tour as well.
 Approximately 140 people were hired locally in each city to set up and load out the show for the arena.

Cast
The 51-member performance troupe included multiple musicians, singers, acrobats, and characters. Characters mentioned in the show's promotional literature included:

 The Urban Worms
 The Multicolored Worms
 The Cavaliers
 The Baroques
 The Death
 The Ringmaster
 The Baron
 The Dreamer
 The Punks
 The Songbird (La Belle)
 The Blue Gypsy
 The Child
 Eddie
 The Angels

Numerous performers had portrayed the Baron and Eddie over the years, including René Bazinet (1992–1996), Gordon White (1993–1994), Julien Cottereau (1994–1997, 1998, 2000, 2004-2005), Lee Ross (1999–2001), Jesko von den Steinen (2002–2005, 2006), Amo Gulinello (2005–2011), and Martin Pons (2011–2012).

The 1993 Costa Mesa cast of 36 included;

With Miguel Arias, Dimitrii Arnaoutov, Rene Bazinet, Alain Berge, Pawel Biegaj , Witek Biegaj, Martin Boisvert, Jean-Paul Boun, Jenny Clement, Andrea Conway, Vincent Cotnoir, Nicolas Dupere, Joscelyn Drainville, Alain Gauthier, Nui Guishan, Sun Hongli, Miguel Herrera, Galina Karableva, Guy Kaye, Brigitt Larochelle, Isabelle Larose, Jean-Francois Lemieux, Marco Lorador, Paulo Lorador, Daniel Olivier, Francois Dumais, Francine Poitras, Mathieu Roy, Karyne Steben, Sarah Steben, Sonia St-Martin, Zhang Shengli, Anton Tchelnokov, Nikolai Tchelnokov, Neomi Tamelio, Guennadi Tchijov, Huang Zhen.

 Acts 
The acts in Saltimbanco were a mix of traditional circus acts with more modern acts.Adagio trio: Three acrobats performed in an adagio that drew inspiration from acrosport.Chinese poles: Up to 26 performers performed in this act using four  poles in the middle of the stage. They climbed up, dropped down, jumped between, hung from, and even spun on these poles.
 Balancing on canes: A handbalance artist performed feats of strength and various contortion poses, including the Marinelli bend, while balancing on high handstand supports.Juggling: A juggler used multiple balls in a display of increasing dexterity.Boleadoras:  Two performers twirled boleadoras in this unique act. The bolas are a percussion instrument that is hit against the ground to produce a loud popping sound. The act later included the use of the Taiko by one of the performers while the other used the bolas to play a complementary beat.Russian swing: Multiple artists jumped off a large swing, performing twists, spins, and flips, before landing on human pyramids, a mat, and other props.Solo trapeze: A young artist swung a trapeze incredibly high, whenever the trapeze was swung high the artist would spin up multiple times, and would catch the bar of the trapeze with her legs.Hand-to-hand: A duo used an incredible amount of body strength in this act as one would balance in a handstand on the other.Bungee:  Four aerialists suspended from bungees flipped, swung, and bounced in synchronization with each other.

Rotational acts
 Aerial straps: A performer swung on these straps and would use upper body strength to create many dangerous poses.

Retired actsTight rope (double wire): An acrobat ascended a wire as two more tightropes, one three feet higher than the other, were revealed. She performed various tricks including flips, spins, and splits. She even backflipped from one rope to the other, and then jumped back. This act was removed from the arena version due to rigging issues.Contortion: This act featured four female contortionists from a previous Cirque du Soleil show, Nouvelle Expérience. It replaced the hand-to-hand act for several years, but did not continue after the 1998 revival.Diabolo: This was a solo diabolo act using Western-style diabolo tricks.Vertical rope: This was one of the original Saltimbanco acts, a Spanish web act originally performed by the adagio troupe. This act was not seen outside of the North America/Japan tour.Manipulation: This act featured three women manipulating ribbons and hoops. It replaced the boleadoras act.Artistic bicycle: A bicycle artist wheeled around the stage, all the while playing the guitar, hand balancing, swinging and dancing on wheels.Duo trapeze''': This act featured two female artists who would swing on a trapeze, one would leap off and would be caught at the last minute by the other performer and be brought back onto the trapeze for the next trick.

Costumes
The costumes in Saltimbanco were bright and vivid in color to accentuate the dynamism of the urban city.  The colors used in the costumes were all primary colors: cyan, yellow, magenta, and green. The Baron, clad in black, red, and white, wore a cape, length-arm gloves, and tights. The Multi-Colored Worms wore jumpsuits that covered everything but their faces. The Urban Worms's masks were made of a polyester resin base which was both hypoallergenic and permeable to air.

Music

The Saltimbanco score was written and composed by René Dupéré, and was released as a studio album on October 9, 1992. The music has a range of musical influences from the classical to the modern.

The original soundtrack features the vocal work of Canadian vocalist Francine Poitras. In 2005, Cirque du Soleil re-recorded and released the soundtrack to update its music. Some songs were completely re-recorded, while others had new instrumentation added and included Poitras's original vocal track. Additional and new vocals were provided by Laurence Janot, a French singer who was touring with the show at the time. Every track was slightly edited in some form from the original CD.

Several other limited editions of the album have been released. In 2001 Cirque du Soleil Musique released a limited edition of the original 1992 soundtrack featuring two additional tracks, "Arlequin" and "Adagio" (performed by Laur Fugere). Another limited edition of the CD, Saltimbanco Live in Amsterdam, was created and distributed exclusively to staff members of Saltimbanco. The employee special edition features a live, in-house recording of an entire performance and is considered a collector's item.

Below is the list of tracks featured in the 2005 re-release of the album and alongside are the acts during which each song was performed.

 Kumbalawé (Opening pt. 2) Saltimbanco (Chinese poles) Cantus-Mélopée (Solo trapeze, 1994–2006, 2011-2012) Norweg (Double wire, 1992–2006) Kazé (Double wire, 1992–2006) Barock (Russian swing) Adagio (Adagio trio) Amazonia (Duo trapeze, 1992–2011, 2011-2012) Pokinoï 
 (Vertical rope, 1992–1994) (Boleadoras transition) Il Sogno Di Volare (Bungee) Horéré Ukundé (Finale) Rideau (Opening pt. 1)Other songs
 Cloche et Présentation (Introduction to the show) Clown (Eddie's Clown acts) Jungle (Eddie's Clown acts, 1992–1997, 1998, 2000, 2004-2005) Standoff (Eddie's Clown acts) Slaloom (Bicycle)
 Diabolo (2002–2006)
 Artistic Bycicle (2007–2011)
 Aerial Straps (2012) Rêve (Transition)
 Rave Out (Kusimano)
 Contortion (1995–1997) Manipulation (1998–2001)
 Balancing on Canes (2009–2012) Arlequin (Juggling) Darkness (Intro to Boleadoras) Malamba Ver.1 (Boleadoras, 1992–1994) Malamba Ver.2 (Boleadoras, 1995–2006) Malamba Ver.3 (Boleadoras, 2007–2012) Cabaret (Cabaret Transition - Russian Swing transition, 1992–1994) Tap Dance (Cabaret Transition - Russian Swing transition, 1994–2005) Pocoleta (Second act intro, 2006–2012) Démontage Trapèze (Solo/Double Trapeze transition) La Mort (Character scene) Urgence (Hand to Hand) Transfert (Transition from bungee)Further information
Cirque du Soleil discography

Filmography

Saltimbanco's Diary

Cirque du Soleil Presents: Saltimbanco
The show was filmed and released as a 78-minute VHS in 1994, though the show's acts continued to change significantly after it was filmed.

Saltimbanco 20 ans Pour Toujours / Forever 20
In 2012, just before the show's retirement, a behind-the-scenes documentary was filmed, titled Saltimbanco Forever 20 (directed by Eric Chaussé; director of photography: Miguel Henriques; editor: Julie Bouffard). This documentary has thus far remained unreleased, although a short clip was leaked in October 2013. In 2014 another excerpt was leaked featuring an interview with boleadoras performer Adriana Pegueroles;"Adriana Pegueroles, Cirque du Soleil". YouTube. June 26, 2014. another clip, about the show's music, was published in 2019.

TourSaltimbanco toured around the world several times during its original 14-year tour under the Grand Chapiteau. It played its final show in the Royal Albert Hall in London on 1 February 1997. Saltimbanco was revived the following year on 14 October 1998, and went on to tour the Asia-Pacific region. The show played for another nine years, becoming the first Cirque du Soleil show to tour South America, with visits to Santiago, Chile (March 2006); Buenos Aires, Argentina (May 2006); and São Paulo (August 2006) and Rio de Janeiro, Brazil (October 2006).  That tour's final performance took place in Rio de Janeiro, Brazil on 10 December 2006.

Following its closure in December 2006, Saltimbanco was configured into an arena show format, and re-launched in July 2007 to commence an extensive North American tour, visiting cities and areas that Cirque du Soleil had previously been unable to visit. The tour started in London, Ontario and subsequently toured Canada and the United States. Saltimbanco’s three-year tour of North America ended in Columbus, Ohio. In 2009 the show embarked on its third tour of Europe. Between 2011 and 2012, it visited over 50 cities in South Africa, Australia, New Zealand, Asia, Eastern Europe, and North America.Saltimbancos final performance took place in Montreal on 30 December 2012.Saltimbanco has been to many different regions, here is the list of all of them.
 North American Tour - (1992–1993)
 Japan Tour - (1994)
 Montreal special - (1994–1995)
 European Tour - (1995–1997)
 Ottawa special - (1998)
 Asia & Pacific Tour - (1999–2000)
 North American Tour II (pacific northwest) - (2000)
 Japan Tour II - (2001)
 European Tour II - (2002–2005)
 Mexican Tour - (2005–2006)
 South American Tour - (2006)
 North American Arena Tour - (2007–2009)
 European Tour III - (2009–2011)
 South African Tour - (2011)
 Australian Tour - (2011)
 European Tour - (2011–2012)
 Asian Middle East Tour - (2012)
 North American Arena Tour II - (2012)

The following colorboxes indicate the region of each performance: Europe  North America  South America  Asia/Pacific  Oceania  Africa

Arena tour

1996 schedule

 London, UK (Royal Albert Hall)- From 5 Jan 1996 to 28 Jan 1996

1997 schedule

 London, UK (Royal Albert Hall) - From 2 Jan 1997 to 1 Feb 1997

2003 schedule

 London, UK (Royal Albert Hall)- From 7 Jan 2003 to 6 Feb 2003

2007 schedule

  London, ON - From 31 Jul 2007 to 5 Aug 2007
  Ottawa, ON - From 8 Aug 2007 to 12 Aug 2007
  Halifax, NS - From 15 Aug 2007 to 19 Aug 2007
  St. John's, NL - From 23 Aug 2007 to 26 Aug 2007
  Saint John, NB - From 30 Aug 2007 to 2 Sep 2007
  Syracuse, NY - From 5 Sep 2007 to 9 Sep 2007
  Wilkes-Barre, PA - From 12 Sep 2007 to 16 Sep 2007
  Greensboro, NC - From 19 Sep 2007 to 23 Sep 2007
  State College, PA - From 26 Sep 2007 to 30 Sep 2007
  Norfolk, VA - From 3 Oct 2007 to 7 Oct 2007
  East Lansing, MI - From 10 Oct 2007 to 14 Oct 2007
  Peoria, IL - From 17 Oct 2007 to 18 Oct 2007
  Champaign, IL - From 9 Nov 2007 to 10 Nov 2007
  Green Bay, WI - From 13 Nov 2007 to 15 Nov 2007
  Madison, WI - From 17 Nov 2007 to 19 Nov 2007
  Dayton, OH - From 21 Nov 2007 to 25 Nov 2007
  Colorado Springs, CO - From 28 Nov 2007 to 1 Dec 2007
  Denver, CO - From 3 Dec 2007 to 13 Dec 2007
  Montréal, QC - From 19 Dec 2007 to 30 Dec 2007

2008 schedule

  Québec, QC - From 3 Jan 2008 to 8 Jan 2008
  Chicoutimi, QC - From 16 Jan 2008 to 19 Jan 2008
  Detroit, MI - From 23 Jan 2008 to 27 Jan 2008
  Cleveland, OH - From 29 Jan 2008 to 1 Feb 2008
  Memphis, TN - From 20 Feb 2008 to 21 Feb 2008
  Charlottesville, VA - From 26 Feb 2008 to 1 Mar 2008
  Little Rock, AR - From 4 Mar 2008 to 6 Mar 2008
  Shreveport, LA - From 8 Mar 2008 to 9 Mar 2008
  San Antonio, TX - From 12 Mar 2008 to 16 Mar 2008
  Laredo, TX - From 18 Mar 2008 to 19 Mar 2008
  Corpus Christi, TX - From 21 Mar 2008 to 22 Mar 2008
  Wichita, KS - From 26 Mar 2008 to 30 Mar 2008
  Omaha, NE - From 2 Apr 2008 to 6 Apr 2008
  Des Moines, IA - From 10 Apr 2008 to 13 Apr 2008
  Moline, IL - From 15 Apr 2008 to 18 Apr 2008
  Cedar Rapids, IA - From 23 Apr 2008 to 27 Apr 2008
  Albuquerque, NM - From 14 May 2008 to 18 May 2008
  Boise, ID - From 21 May 2008 to 25 May 2008
  Victoria, BC - From 30 May 2008 to 1 Jun 2008
  Kelowna, BC - From 4 Jun 2008 to 8 Jun 2008
  Kamloops, BC - From 11 Jun 2008 to 15 Jun 2008
  Edmonton, AB - From 18 Jun 2008 to 22 Jun 2008
  Saskatoon, SK - From 25 Jun 2008 to 29 Jun 2008
  Regina, SK - From 2 Jul 2008 to 6 Jul 2008
  Winnipeg, MB - From 9 Jul 2008 to 13 Jul 2008
  Kansas City, MO - From 16 Jul 2008 to 20 Jul 2008
  Newark, NJ - From 7 Aug 2008 to 10 Aug 2008
  Toronto, ON - From 13 Aug 2008 to 24 Aug 2008
  Hamilton, ON - From 27 Aug 2008 to 31 Aug 2008
  Amherst, MA - From 3 Sep 2008 to 7 Sep 2008
  Buffalo, NY - From 10 Sep 2008 to 14 Sep 2008
  Trenton, NJ - From 17 Sep 2008 to 21 Sep 2008
  Minneapolis, MN - From 24 Sep 2008 to 28 Sep 2008
  Milwaukee, WI - From 1 Oct 2008 to 5 Oct 2008
  Highland Heights, KY - From 8 Oct 2008 to 12 Oct 2008
  Honolulu, HI - From 30 Oct 2008 to 16 Nov 2008
  Prescott Valley, AZ - From 20 Nov 2008 to 23 Nov 2008
  Tucson, AZ - From 26 Nov 2008 to 30 Nov 2008
  Oklahoma City, OK - From 3 Dec 2008 to 7 Dec 2008
  Tulsa, OK - From 10 Dec 2008 to 14 Dec 2008
  Hidalgo, TX - From 17 Dec 2008 to 21 Dec 2008

2009 schedule

  Tupelo, MS - From 9 Jan 2009 to 11 Jan 2009
  Biloxi, MS - From 14 Jan 2009 to 18 Jan 2009
  Hoffman Estates, IL - From 21 Jan 2009 to 1 Feb 2009
  St. Charles, MO - From 4 Feb 2009 to 8 Feb 2009
  Indianapolis, IN - From 12 Feb 2009 to 15 Feb 2009
  Baton Rouge, LA - From 18 Feb 2009 to 20 Feb 2009
  Rockford, IL - From 24 Feb 2009 to 1 Mar 2009
  Youngstown, OH - From 4 Mar 2009 to 8 Mar 2009
  Louisville, KY - From 11 Mar 2009 to 15 Mar 2009
  Mobile, AL - From 2 Apr 2009 to 5 Apr 2009
  Nashville, TN - From 9 Apr 2009 to 12 Apr 2009
  Huntsville, AL - From 15 Apr 2009 to 19 Apr 2009
  Charleston, SC - From 22 Apr 2009 to 26 Apr 2009
  Lakeland, FL - From 29 Apr 2009 to 3 May 2009
  Gainesville, FL - From 7 May 2009 to 10 May 2009
  Tallahassee, FL - From 13 May 2009 to 17 May 2009
  Jacksonville, FL - From 20 May 2009 to 24 May 2009
  Sunrise, FL - From 27 May 2009 to 7 Jun 2009
  Tampa, FL - From 25 Jun 2009 to 5 Jul 2009
  Estero, FL - From 8 Jul 2009 to 12 Jul 2009
  Cypress, TX - From 15 Jul 2009 to 15 Jul 2009
  Houston, TX - From 22 Jul 2009 to 26 Jul 2009
  Phoenix, AZ - From 29 Jul 2009 to 2 Aug 2009
  Salt Lake City, UT - From 5 Aug 2009 to 9 Aug 2009
  Columbus, OH - From 12 Aug 2009 to 23 Aug 2009
  Stockholm, SE - From 17 Sep 2009 to 20 Sep 2009
  Helsinki, FI - From 23 Sep 2009 to 27 Sep 2009
  Turku, FI - From 30 Sep 2009 to 4 Oct 2009
  Oslo, NO - From 8 Oct 2009 to 11 Oct 2009
  Aalborg, DK - From 14 Oct 2009 to 18 Oct 2009
  Copenhagen, DK - From 21 Oct 2009 to 1 Nov 2009
  Gothenburg, SE - From 4 Nov 2009 to 8 Nov 2009
  Mannheim, DE - From 10 Nov 2009 to 14 Nov 2009
  Nice, FR - From 18 Nov 2009 to 22 Nov 2009
  Rotterdam, NL - From 10 Dec 2009 to 13 Dec 2009
  Geneva, CH - From 18 Dec 2009 to 27 Dec 2009
  Barcelona, ES - From 30 Dec 2009 to 10 Jan 2010

2010 schedule

  Salzburg, AT - From 13 Jan 2010 to 17 Jan 2010
  Strasbourg, FR - From 20 Jan 2010 to 23 Jan 2010
  Frankfurt, DE - From 27 Jan 2010 to 31 Jan 2010
  Nantes, FR - From 2 Feb 2010 to 5 Feb 2010
  Innsbruck, AT - From 25 Feb 2010 to 28 Feb 2010
  Torino, IT - From 3 Mar 2010 to 7 Mar 2010
  Pesaro, IT - From 10 Mar 2010 to 14 Mar 2010
  Bologna, IT - From 17 Mar 2010 to 21 Mar 2010
  Florence, IT - From 24 Mar 2010 to 28 Mar 2010
  Stuttgart, DE - From 31 Mar 2010 to 4 Apr 2010
  Bremen, DE - From 7 Apr 2010 to 11 Apr 2010
  Valencia, ES - From 14 Apr 2010 to 18 Apr 2010
  Santiago, ES - From 21 Apr 2010 to 25 Apr 2010
  San Sebastian, ES - From 28 Apr 2010 to 2 May 2010
  Sheffield, UK - From 20 May 2010 to 23 May 2010
  Liverpool, UK - From 26 May 2010 to 30 May 2010
  Glasgow, UK - From 2 Jun 2010 to 6 Jun 2010
  Manchester, UK - From 9 Jun 2010 to 13 Jun 2010
  Birmingham, UK - From 17 Jun 2010 to 27 Jun 2010
  Newcastle, UK - From 30 Jun 2010 to 4 Jul 2010
  Dublin, IE - From 7 Jul 2010 to 18 Jul 2010
  Nottingham, UK - From 21 Jul 2010 to 25 Jul 2010
  London, UK - From 28 Jul 2010 to 1 Aug 2010
  Hamburg, DE - From 19 Aug 2010 to 22 Aug 2010
  Dortmund, DE - From 25 Aug 2010 to 29 Aug 2010
  Berlin, DE - From 1 Sep 2010 to 4 Sep 2010
  Munich, DE - From 7 Sep 2010 to 12 Sep 2010
  Milan, IT - From 15 Sep 2010 to 18 Sep 2010
  Zaragoza, ES - From 22 Sep 2010 to 26 Sep 2010
  Granada, ES - From 29 Sep 2010 to 3 Oct 2010
  Madrid, ES - From 5 Oct 2010 to 10 Oct 2010
  Lisbon, PT - From 13 Oct 2010 to 24 Oct 2010
  Prague, CZ - From 12 Nov 2010 to 14 Nov 2010
  Zagreb, HR - From 17 Nov 2010 to 21 Nov 2010
  Belgrade, RS - From 24 Nov 2010 to 28 Nov 2010
  Basel, CH - From 1 Dec 2010 to 5 Dec 2010
  Budapest, HU - From 8 Dec 2010 to 12 Dec 2010
  Nurnberg, DE - From 15 Dec 2010 to 19 Dec 2010
  Antwerp, BE - From 22 Dec 2010 to 2 Jan 2011

2011 schedule

  Lille, FR - From 5 Jan 2011 to 9 Jan 2011
  Paris, FR - From 13 Jan 2011 to 16 Jan 2011
  Friedrichshafen, DE - From 11 Feb 2011 to 13 Feb 2011
  Istanbul, TR - From 18 Feb 2011 to 5 Mar 2011
  Johannesburg, ZA - From 9 Mar 2011 to 20 Mar 2011
  Cape Town, ZA - From 23 Mar 2011 to 3 Apr 2011
  Perth, AU - From 21 Apr 2011 to 8 May 2011
  Adelaide, AU - From 12 May 2011 to 22 May 2011
  Melbourne, AU - From 25 May 2011 to 11 Jun 2011
  Hobart, AU - From 15 Jun 2011 to 19 Jun 2011
  Brisbane, AU - From 8 Jul 2011 to 17 Jul 2011
  Newcastle, AU - From 20 Jul 2011 to 24 Jul 2011
  Sydney, AU - From 27 Jul 2011 to 14 Aug 2011
  Wollongong, AU - From 17 Aug 2011 to 21 Aug 2011
  Auckland, NZ - From 25 Aug 2011 to 4 Sep 2011
  Shanghai, CN - From 21 Sep 2011 to 1 Oct 2011
  Ekaterinburg, RU - From 15 Oct 2011 to 23 Oct 2011
  Kazan, RU - From 26 Oct 2011 to 30 Oct 2011
  Moscow, RU - From 3 Nov 2011 to 13 Nov 2011
  St Petersburg, RU - From 16 Nov 2011 to 21 Nov 2011
  Kyiv, UA - From 27 Nov 2011 to 4 Dec 2011
  Vilnius, LT - From 15 Dec 2011 17 Dec 2011
  Riga, LV - From 21 Dec 2011 to 25 Dec 2011
  Tallinn, EE - From 28 Dec 2011 to 1 Jan 2012

2012 schedule

  Gdansk, PL - From 19 Jan 2012 to 22 Jan 2012
  Malmo, SE - From 26 Jan 2012 to 29 Jan 2012
  Sofia, BG - From 3 Feb 2012 to 5 Feb 2012
  Bucharest, RO - From 8 Feb 2012 to 12 Feb 2012
  Bratislava, SK - From 15 Feb 2012 to 19 Feb 2012
  Graz, AT - From 22 Feb 2012 to 26 Feb 2012
  Bordeaux, FR - From 2 Mar 2012 to 5 Mar 2012
  Dijon, FR - From 9 Mar 2012 to 11 Mar 2012
  Rome, IT - From 15 Mar 2012 to 18 Mar 2012
  Casablanca, MA - From 6 Apr to 15 Apr 2012
  Beirut, LB - From 10 May 2012 to 20 May 2012
  Catany, IT - From 5 Jun 2012 to 17 Jun 2012
  Ammán, JO - From 26 Jun 2012 to 30 Jun 2012
  Doha, QA - From 4 Jul 2012 to 7 Jul 2012
  Hong Kong, HK - From 12 Jul 2012 to 22 Jul 2012
  Singapore, SG - From 26 Jul 2012 to 5 Aug 2012
  Manila, PH - From 9 Aug 2012 to 19 Aug 2012
  Kaohsiung, TW - From 29 Aug 2012 to 2 Sep 2012
  Taipei, TW - From 5 Sep 2012 to 9 Sep 2012
  Portland, ME - From 10 Oct 2012 to 14 Oct 2012
  Pittsburgh, PA - From 18 Oct 2012 to 21 Oct 2012
  Reading, PA - From 25 Oct 2012 to 27 Oct 2012
  Boston, MA - From 31 Oct 2012 to 4 Nov 2012
  Pensacola, FL - From 7 Nov 2012 to 8 Nov 2012
  San Juan, PR - From 15 Nov 2012 to 18 Nov 2012
  Santo Domingo, DO - From 22 Nov 2012 to 25 Nov 2012
  Cedar Park, TX - From 12 Dec 2012 to 16 Dec 2012
  Montréal, QC - From 19 Dec 2012 to 30 Dec 2012 (final show)

Grand Chapiteau tour

1992 schedule
 Montréal, QC - From 23 Apr 1992 to 2 Jun 1992 (show première) Québec, QC - From 13 Jun 1992 to 28 Jun 1992
 San Francisco, CA - From 14 Jul 1992 to 16 Aug 1992
 San Jose, CA - From 27 Aug 1992 to 27 Sep 1992
 Santa Monica, CA - From 8 Oct 1992 to 20 Dec 1992

1993 schedule
 Costa Mesa, CA - From 30 Jan 1993 to 14 Mar 1993
 New York, NY - From 30 Mar 1993 to 6 Jun 1993
 Toronto, ON - From 18 Jun 1993 to 11 Jul 1993
 Chicago, IL - From 28 Jul 1993 to 29 Aug 1993
 Boston, MA - From 9 Sep 1993 to 3 Oct 1993
 Washington, DC - From 14 Oct 1993 to 7 Nov 1993
 Atlanta, GA - From 18 Nov 1993 to 19 Dec 1993

1994 schedule
 Tokyo, JP - From 11 Mar 1994 to 11 Sep 1994
 Montreal, QC - From 02 Nov 1994 to 08 Jan 1995

1995 schedule
 Amsterdam, NL - From 9 Mar 1995 to 13 Apr 1995
 Munich, DE - From 19 May 1995 to 9 Jul 1995
 Berlin, DE - From 21 Jul 1995 to 3 Sep 1995
 Düsseldorf, DE - From 15 Sep 1995 to 17 Oct 1995
 Vienna, AT - From 10 Nov 1995 to 17 Dec 1995

1996 schedule
(Saltimbanco played in the Royal Albert Hall in London, UK during this time)
 Hamburg, DE - From 8 Feb 1996 to 10 Mar 1996
 Amsterdam, NL - From 5 Apr 1996 to 19 May 1996
 Stuttgart, DE - From 31 May 1996 to 14 Jul 1996
 Antwerp, BE - From 26 Jul 1996 to 1 Sep 1996
 Zurich, CH - From 13 Sep 1996 to 20 Oct 1996
 Frankfurt, DE - From 11 Nov 1996 to 22 Dec 1996

1997 schedule
(Saltimbanco played in the Royal Albert Hall in London, UK during this time)

1998 schedule
 Ottawa, ON - From 14 Oct 1998 to 1 Nov 1998

1999 schedule
 Sydney, AU - From 7 Jan 1999 to 7 Mar 1999
 Melbourne, AU - From 18 Mar 1999 to 16 May 1999
 Brisbane, AU - From 28 May 1999 to 8 Jul 1999
 Adelaide, AU - From 21 Jul 1999 to 25 Aug 1999
 Perth, AU - From 9 Sep 1999 to 17 Oct 1999
 Singapore, SG - From 25 Nov 1999 to 8 Jan 2000

2000 schedule
 Hong Kong, HK - From 25 Jan 2000 to 19 Mar 2000
 Portland, OR - From 11 May 2000 to 25 Jun 2000
 Seattle, WA - From 6 Jul 2000 to 3 Sep 2000
 Tokyo, JP - From 12 Oct 2000 to 28 Jan 2001

2001 schedule
 Fukuoka, JP - From 9 Feb 2001 to 8 Apr 2001
 Nagoya, JP - From 20 Apr 2001 to 3 Jun 2001
 Osaka, JP - From 10 Jun 2001 to 9 Sep 2001
 Yokohama, JP - From 20 Sep 2001 to 25 Nov 2001

2002 schedule
 Amsterdam, NL - From 14 Feb 2002 to 14 Apr 2002
 Barcelona, ES - From 26 Apr 2002 to 26 May 2002
 Vienna, AT - From 10 Jul 2002 to 4 Aug 2002
 Brussels, BE - From 4 Sep 2002 to 19 Oct 2002
 Madrid, ES - From 31 Oct 2002 to 26 Dec 2002

2003 schedule
(Saltimbanco played in the Royal Albert Hall in London, UK during this time)
 Bilbao, ES - From 26 Feb 2003 to 6 Apr 2003
 Geneva, CH - From 18 Apr 2003 to 25 May 2003
 Cologne, DE - From 5 Jun 2003 to 29 Jun 2003
 Oostende, BE - From 24 Jul 2003 to 17 Aug 2003
 Zurich, CH - From 19 Sep 2003 to 26 Oct 2003
 Valencia, ES - From 28 Nov 2003 to 21 Dec 2003

2004 schedule
 Seville, ES - From 16 Jan 2004 to 22 Feb 2004
 Lyon, FR - From 5 Mar 2004 to 18 Apr 2004
 Milan, IT - From 29 Apr 2004 to 6 Jun 2004
 Gijon, ES - From 25 Jun 2004 to 31 Jul 2004
 Frankfurt, DE - From 20 Aug 2004 to 25 Sep 2004
 Rome, IT - From 7 Oct 2004 to 31 Oct 2004
 Lille, FR - From 25 Nov 2004 to 26 Dec 2004

2005 schedule
 Manchester, UK - From 6 Jan 2005 to 27 Jan 2005
 Birmingham, UK - From 24 Feb 2005 to 13 Mar 2005
 Paris, FR - From 8 Apr 2005 to 17 Jul 2005
 Monterrey, MX - From 4 Aug 2005 to 11 Sep 2005
 Mexico City, MX - From 22 Sep 2005 to 6 Nov 2005
 Guadalajara, MX - From 17 Nov 2005 to 1 Jan 2006

2006 schedule
 Mexico City, MX - From 13 Jan 2006 to 5 Feb 2006
 Santiago, CL - From 15 Mar 2006 to 22 Apr 2006
 Buenos Aires, AR - From 5 May 2006 to 11 Jun 2006
 São Paulo, BR - From 3 Aug 2006 to 22 Oct 2006
 Rio de Janeiro, BR - From 2 Nov 2006 to 10 Dec 2006 (final show under Big Top)

 References 

 External links 
 Saltimbanco’s official page at Cirque du Soleil
Alexis Brothers: Official website of Marco and Paulo Lorador, the original hand-to-hand act in Saltimbanco.
Armen Chakmakian and Armen Blog: Official website and blog for Armen Chakmakian, keyboardist for Saltimbanco band.
Artistic Bicycle: Ivan Do-Duc - Artistic bicycle act in Saltimbanco''

Cirque du Soleil touring shows